Dahlen may refer to:

Places
Dahlen, Saxony, a town in Saxony, Germany
Dahlen Castle, built between 1744 and 1751
Dahlen, Saxony-Anhalt, a municipality in Saxony-Anhalt, Germany
Dahlen, North Dakota

Other uses
Dahlen (surname)

See also
Dahl (disambiguation)
Dahlin (surname)